David Leslie Murray (1888–1962) was a British writer and editor of the Times Literary Supplement from 1938 to 1945.

Biography 
Murray was born in London on 5 February 1888. He was educated at Harrow School and Balliol College, Oxford. Murray first pursued a career in acting before joining staff of the Times Literary Supplement in 1920.  In 1962, Murray committed suicide by poison.

Books 
 Pragmatism (1912)
 Scenes and Silhouettes (1926)
 Disraeli (1927)
 Trumpeter, Sound! (1934)
 Regency: A Quadruple Portrait (1936)
 Enter Three Witches (1942)
 Folly Bridge: a romantic tale (1945)

References 

1888 births
1962 deaths
People educated at Harrow School
Alumni of Balliol College, Oxford
British writers
British newspaper editors
British newspaper people
People from London
1962 suicides
Suicides by poison
Suicides in the United Kingdom